S. japonica  may refer to:
 Saccharina japonica, the Dashi kombu, a marine brown alga species extensively cultivated in China, Japan and Korea
 Salix japonica, a willow species native to central Honshū in Japan
 Scopolia japonica, the Japanese belladonna, a flowering plant species
 Sillago japonica, the Japanese whiting, Japanese sillago or Shiro-gisu, a common coastal marine fish species found in Korea, China and Taiwan
 Skimmia japonica, a shrub species native to Japan
 Spiraea japonica, the Japanese spiraea, a plant species native to Japan, China and Korea
 Squatina japonica, the Japanese angelshark, a shark species found in the western Pacific from Japan, the Yellow Sea, Korea, northern China and the Philippines
 Stigmella japonica, a moth species only known from Hokkaido in Japan
 Strioterebrum japonica, a sea snail species
 Swertia japonica, a flowering plant species

Synonyms 
 Scilla japonica, a synonym for Barnardia japonica, a plant species
 Serissa japonica, a synonym for Serissa foetida, the snowrose, tree of a thousand stars or Japanese boxthorn, a flowering plant species native to India, China to Japan
 Sophora japonica, a synonym for Styphnolobium japonicum, the pagoda tree, a small tree or shrub species native to eastern Asia

See also 
 Japonica (disambiguation)